Donovan Cole Smith (born June 23, 1993) is an American football offensive tackle who is a free agent. He played college football at Penn State, and was drafted by the Tampa Bay Buccaneers in the second round of the 2015 NFL Draft.

Early years
Smith was born in Hempstead, New York and lived in New York until he and his twin sister moved to Owings Mills, Maryland prior to their sophomore year in high school to live with their uncle and his wife.

He attended Owings Mills High School, where he played football. He did not allow a single sack as a junior or senior and also was a standout defensive lineman. Smith played in the 2011 U.S. Army All-American Bowl. Smith also participated in track & field. Smith was rated by Rivals.com as a four-star recruit and was ranked as the ninth-best offensive tackle in his class. He committed to Penn State to play college football.

College career
Smith attended Penn State from 2011 to 2014. After redshirting his first year, Smith would become a starter in 2012 and would start 31 games during his career.

After the 2014 season, Smith decided to forgo his final year of eligibility and entered the 2015 NFL Draft.

Professional career

NFL Combine

Tampa Bay Buccaneers
The Tampa Bay Buccaneers selected Smith in the second round with the 34th overall pick in the 2015 NFL Draft. On June 1, 2015, the Buccaneers signed him to a four-year, $6.06 million contract with $4.37 million guaranteed and a signing bonus of $2.67 million.

He entered his rookie season as the Buccaneers' starting left tackle. Smith started the Buccaneers' season-opening loss to the Tennessee Titans. He finished his rookie season starting all 16 regular season contests.

Smith was named the starting left tackle again the following season under new head coach Dirk Koetter. In the 2016 season, he played in all 16 games and started 15. In the 2017 and 2018 seasons, he started all 16 games.

On March 5, 2019, Smith signed a three-year, $41.5 million contract extension with the Buccaneers.

Smith was placed on the reserve/COVID-19 list by the team on December 18, 2020, and activated on December 22. Smith played and started all four games in the Buccaneers' playoff run that resulted in the team winning Super Bowl LV.

On March 25, 2021, Smith signed a two-year, $31.8 million contract extension with the Buccaneers through the 2023 season.

On March 7, 2023, Buccaneers released Smith after eight seasons.

Personal life
Smith was raised by his mother, Sharon Smith, and has four siblings. He has three sisters named Ebony, Tamika, and Danielle and has one brother named Dwayne. He studied criminology at Penn State and wants to become a detective or FBI agent in the future. He also enjoys reading, cooking, video games, fishing, and watching standup comedy.

He appeared as a human canvas on the eighth season of Spike TV's Ink Master.

References

External links
Tampa Bay Buccaneers bio
Penn State Nittany Lions bio 

1993 births
Living people
American football offensive tackles
Penn State Nittany Lions football players
People from Hempstead (town), New York
People from Owings Mills, Maryland
Players of American football from New York (state)
Players of American football from Maryland
Sportspeople from Baltimore County, Maryland
Sportspeople from Nassau County, New York
Tampa Bay Buccaneers players